Børkop railway station is a railway station serving the railway town of Børkop in East Jutland, Denmark.

The station is located on the Fredericia-Aarhus railway line from Fredericia to Aarhus. It opened in 1868. It offers direct regional train services to Aarhus and Fredericia. The train services are operated by the national railway company DSB.

History 
Børkop station was opened on 3 October 1868 with the opening of the Fredericia-Aarhus railway line from Fredericia to Aarhus.

Operations 
The train services are operated by the national railway company DSB. The station offers regional train services to Aarhus and Fredericia.

See also
 List of railway stations in Denmark

References

Citations

Bibliography

External links
 Banedanmark – government agency responsible for maintenance and traffic control of most of the Danish railway network
 DSB – largest Danish train operating company
 Danske Jernbaner – website with information on railway history in Denmark

Railway stations opened in 1868
Railway stations in the Region of Southern Denmark
1868 establishments in Denmark
Niels Peder Christian Holsøe railway stations
Railway stations in Denmark opened in the 19th century